Üçocak is a town (belde) in Arıcak District, Elazığ Province, Turkey. Its population is 2,474 (2021).

References

Towns in Turkey
Populated places in Elazığ Province
Arıcak District